Mahtaş is a village in Tarsus district of Mersin Province, Turkey. It is situated in Çukurova and to the south of Tarsus. At  it is almost merged with Tarsus. The population of village is 307  as of 2011.

References

Villages in Tarsus District